TZU (pronounced "Tee Zed Yoo") were an Australian hip hop group, formed in 1999 by Joelistics, Yeroc, Seed MC and Paso Bionic. They used instruments in live performances, giving their shows a rock-infused feeling. Duzy What joined in 2005. TZU released four studio albums, Position Correction (2004), Smiling at Strangers (2005), Computer Love (2008, which peaked in the ARIA Charts top 30) and Millions of Moments (2012), before disbanding in 2013.

History 

TZU were formed as an Australian hip hop band in 1999 in Melbourne, initially as a side project, by Joel Ma  Joelistics on vocals, guitar and bass guitar; Corey McGregor  Yeroc on drums and samplers; Phillip Norman  Seed MC or Countbounce on vocals, guitar and bass guitar (ex-Pan); Shehab Tariq  Paso Bionic (ex-Curse ov Dialect). Pan were a "drum-and-bass/funk/reggae mash-up" band, while Curse ov Dialect were an "oddball experimental hip hop group with a penchant for throwing meat at the audience."

According to Joelistics, the group's name is taken from the Chinese philosopher Lao Tzu, which was suggested by Lee Hartney of the Smith Street Band. Styled as TZU and originally pronounced "Tzu" its pronunciation was changed to "Tee Zed You" to add an "element of mystery." Their debut seven-track extended play (EP), um... just a liddlbidova mic check (2001), was recorded in a portable studio, "in the back of a truck," parked near Hobart. Local Noises Tony Mitchell described it as "tentative." After the EP's appearance they were signed to Liberation Music.

TZU's debut album, Position Correction, appeared on 19 February 2004 and was co-produced by Seed and Yeroc, which peaked just outside the ARIA Charts top 100 in March. Greg Lawrence of WHAMMO described how the quartet, "[are] a bunch of true technicians who successfully transmit their love for beats and lyrics. The double-pronged vocal attack is more exact than the scalpel of a master surgeon, the subterranean bass growls and snappy beats are premium." Mitchell felt, "[it] covers a wide range of moods, styles and tempos, and represents another new direction in Australian hip-hop coming from an idiosyncratic Melbourne push which is making an important impact on local indigenisations of the genre." 

In 2005 keyboard player, Duzy What was added to the group's line-up. TZU issued their second studio album, Smiling at Strangers, which was produced by Magoo (Regurgitator, Butterfingers). It reached the ARIA Albums Chart top 100 in late September. Mitchell noticed, "[they] can successfully combine rock and hip hop... through a desire to experiment with and stretch the often restrictive parameters of MCing and Djing." Simon Jones of Soulshine compared it to their debut album, "[they] have taken a more instrument-based approach in the studio, leaving behind the beats and samples of their debut Position Correction and replacing them with guitars, piano, drums and the occasional horn line." In February 2006 the album was short-listed for the inaugural Australian Music Prize for releases in 2005.

In February-March 2006, they won Yahoo! Music's "Who's Next" monthly music public-voted poll. In November of that year they re-released Smiling at Strangers as a limited edition 2×CD, Snarling at Strangers, with the addition of a second five-track disc, Snarl, and three music videos. The additional, previously unreleased tracks were described by Tristan of There Is no Roseability as, "a harsh critique of current politics/society. It's not as militaristic or angry as The Herd's material, but it's harsh nonetheless. It still has the genius wit and timelessness of Australian hip-hop."

In 2008, the band released their third studio album, Computer Love. Rolling Stone Australia said "Melbourne group TZU just can't stop upping the ante ... They meld classic eighties electro with the more traditional funk keeping the emphasis on authenticity and class throughout." Inpress said "Computer Love is full of old school synth's, masterful sampling and live instrumentation - a maverick in its field and release that will set a new standard for the Australian music landscape."

Richard Kingsmill, Musical Director of Australian radio station Triple J, stated in regard to the band's 2008 J Award nomination for Computer Love, "They open their album saying "TZU still feelin' awesome". I couldn't agree more. They keep growing as an act and expanding on their influences. This album has so much life and they're doing all this themselves. No mentors, producers or anyone getting in the way. Pure talent."

In 2012, after a period of inactivity for the band, TZU released their fourth and final album Millions of Moments. To promote the album, they went on tour. Subsequently, Joelistics pursued a solo career and Count Bounce became a producer.

Members 

Credits:
 Joel Ma  Joelistics – vocals, guitar, bass guitar
 Corey McGregor  Yeroc – drums, samplers
 Phillip Norman  Seed MC or Countbounce – vocals, guitar, bass guitar
 Shehab Tariq  Paso Bionic – turntables
 Dustin  Duzy What – keyboards

Discography

Studio albums

Remix albums

Extended plays

Singles

Awards and nominations

APRA Awards
The APRA Awards are held in Australia and New Zealand by the Australasian Performing Right Association to recognise songwriting skills, sales and airplay performance by its members annually.

|-
|2007
| "In Front of Me"
| Most Performed Urban Work
| 
|-

Australian Music Prize
The Australian Music Prize (the AMP) is an annual award of $30,000 given to an Australian band or solo artist in recognition of the merit of an album released during the year of award. The commenced in 2005.

|-
| 2005
| Smiling at Strangers
| Australian Music Prize
| 
|-
| 2015
| Leisure
| Australian Music Prize
| 
|-

J Awards
The J Awards are an annual series of Australian music awards that were established by the Australian Broadcasting Corporation's youth-focused radio station Triple J. They commenced in 2005.

|-
| J Awards of 2008
|Computer Love
| Australian Album of the Year
|

References

Australian hip hop groups
Victoria (Australia) musical groups
Musical groups established in 1999
Musical groups disestablished in 2013
1999 establishments in Australia